The Psion Revo, launched in November 1999, is a personal digital assistant (PDA) from Psion. It is the successor to the Psion Series 3 and a light version of Psion Series 5mx. It is software-compatible with the 5mx and has the same processor but is more lightweight ( vs  of 5mx) and substantially smaller. Relative to the Series 5 and 5mx, the Revo has a smaller screen (480 × 160 vs 640 × 240 of Series 5–5mx), and lacks a flash-card slot and backlight.

The Revo comes in two main variants, Psion Revo and Psion Revo Plus, having 8 and 16 MB of random-access memory (RAM) respectively. It is powered by a 36 MHz ARM architecture 710T microprocessor. Among other things, the hardware is equipped with a short-range Infrared Data Association (IrDA) wireless infrared communication system and a touchscreen. Like its bigger counterpart Series 5mx, it comes with a small suite of office and communications programs built into the ROM chips. Other programs are user-installable by using a docking station to send Revo programs from a desktop computer.

SONICblue Incorporated produced a version of the Psion Revo Plus renamed to Diamond Mako, which they distributed in the United States and Canada.

Along with Enfour, Psion made two versions of the Revo for the Chinese market named the 618C (Traditional Chinese characters) and 618S (Simplified Chinese characters).

OpenPsion
Open-source software projects were begun to port Linux to the Psion Revo and other Psion PDAs, including OpenPsion, formerly PsiLinux, and Revol, an optimized version of OpenPsion for the Revo.

Conan
Shortly before the demise of Psion in the commercial PDA market, work had begun on a successor to the Revo, a 3rd-generation PDA with the codename Conan. The Conan ran EPOC Release 6 and was to feature support for Bluetooth and a backlight, although the former did not function in the development builds.

Battery
The Revo was notorious for battery and charging problems. Unlike the Series 5mx, which used 2 user-replaceable AA batteries, the Revo is powered by 2 built-in rechargeable AAA 700 mAh nickel–metal hydride battery (NiMH) batteries, which typically need replacing after about 3 years of use. After backing up all data, the batteries can be accessed by closing the unit, peeling off the Revo logo (using a screwdriver or similar if needed), moving the 2 small pins that are behind it, and lifting up the silver part of the casing. The batteries are wrapped in black tape, which can be removed starting from the left, taking care not to break the thermistor that it also encloses. It may not be possible to separate the batteries from their connectors without damaging the latter, which would then need to be replaced. Injury can result if separation is attempted with a blade. Replacement batteries must be taped in just as securely, otherwise resets can occur due to intermittent power loss. After replacing, the unit must be charged uninterrupted for at least 6 hours, so that the hardware can recalibrate, as per instructions for a new unit.

References

External links
gdgt.com - discussion about Revo replacement
https://www.millican.info/oldsite/revobats.htm - Revo Battery Information

Psion devices
Personal information managers
Computer-related introductions in 1999